The Wellington–Castner House is a historic house in Waltham, Massachusetts. The house was listed on the National Register of Historic Places in 1989.

History
One of the last houses built on Trapelo Road before the advent of suburban subdivision of the area, it was built for Charles Lowell Wellington in 1902, whose family owned land in the area from the 17th century.

Architecture
The -story wood-frame house has simple, vernacular, Queen Anne styling; The house is three bays wide, with a front-facing pedimented gable, and a single-story hip-roofed porch with gable over the stairs, supported by square posts.

See also
National Register of Historic Places listings in Waltham, Massachusetts

References

Houses in Waltham, Massachusetts
Houses on the National Register of Historic Places in Waltham, Massachusetts
Queen Anne architecture in Massachusetts
Houses completed in 1902